"My World" is a song released by Australian rock band Sick Puppies 2007 album Dressed Up as Life. It was released as a single on October 23, 2007.

Music video 
The music video for the song features the band performing, as well as singer/guitarist Shimon Moore giving money to two homeless men, and in return being physically abused by them (a symbol of Moore trying to do good yet getting hurt in return). It also shows bassist Emma Anzai drawing plastic surgery incision marks on herself. It was filmed in the original basement used to film the movie Fight Club.

Charts

References

Sick Puppies songs
2007 singles
2007 songs
Song recordings produced by Rock Mafia
Songs written by Shimon Moore
Virgin Records singles
Songs written by Tim James (musician)
Songs written by Antonina Armato
Songs written by Emma Anzai